The International Stress Prevention Centre (aka CSPC or Community Stress Prevention Centre) established in 1981 Kiryat Shmona, Israel, CSPC is the oldest organization in Israel that deals with the treatment and prevention of psychotrauma. It is a registered NGO and a non for profit organization (NGO 58-015-488-8, 0740) – which promotes stress and crisis management on national, organizational, community and individual levels world wide.

CSPC caters to differentiating circumstances – human or natural disasters, and to a variety of organizational orientations including business environments where CSPC experts evaluate and consult on business recovery and risk communications management plans.

See also
 Mooli Lahad – Founder of the Community Stress Prevention Centre

External links
 CSPC's Official Web Site